Barka N. Sy (born 22 July 1943) is a Senegalese sprinter. He competed in the 100 metres at the 1968, 1972 and the 1976 Summer Olympics. He won a silver medal in the 100 metres at the 1973 All-Africa Games.

References

External links
 

1943 births
Living people
Athletes (track and field) at the 1968 Summer Olympics
Athletes (track and field) at the 1972 Summer Olympics
Athletes (track and field) at the 1976 Summer Olympics
Senegalese male sprinters
Olympic athletes of Senegal
African Games silver medalists for Senegal
African Games medalists in athletics (track and field)
Place of birth missing (living people)
Athletes (track and field) at the 1973 All-Africa Games
20th-century Senegalese people
21st-century Senegalese people